Blumenkrantz is a German and Ashkenazi Jewish surname meaning "flower-wreath". Notable people with the surname include:

Avrohom Blumenkrantz, American rabbi
Jeff Blumenkrantz, American composer

Jewish surnames
German-language surnames
Yiddish-language surnames
Surnames from ornamental names